L. Arlene “Buddy” Clay (1912–2016) was a symphony performer, volunteer plane spotter, and Alaskan judge.

She was born on August 2, 1912, in Gardiner, Maine, to Charles Gordon Palmer and Annie Mayne. She graduated from the New England Conservatory of Music in 1934. Seven years later, she married music conductor Earl V. Clay. They thereafter moved to Manchester, New Hampshire, where they each performed for different symphonies.

During World War II, they moved to Seattle, Washington, and received training from the Civil Aeronautics Administration to become aircraft communicators and controllers which eventually landed them in Alaska. In 1960, four years after the passing of her husband, Clay became one of the first women magistrates for the Alaska court system. The same year Sadie Neakok became the first female to serve in a magisterial capacity. Neither Neakok nor Clay possessed a law degree, though it was not a requirement at the time to serve as a magistrate. She retired from the bench in 1977. Clay was inducted in the Alaska Women's Hall of Fame in 2015. She died on February 11, 2016, in Anchorage, Alaska.

See also 

 Alaska Women's Hall of Fame
 Courts of Alaska
 List of first women lawyers and judges in Alaska

References 

New England Conservatory alumni
1912 births
2016 deaths
Alaska state court judges
20th-century American judges
20th-century American women judges
21st-century American women